Richard Peralta Robledo (born 20 September 1993) is a Panamanian footballer who plays for Panamanian club Tauro F.C. and the Panama national football team.

Club career
He started his career at Alianza in 2010. In January 2015, Peralta went on trial to Honduran giants Motagua but no move materialized.

International career
Peralta won the football tournament at the 2013 Central American Games with the Panama U20 team. The same year he played in the CONCACAF U-20 Championship where the team were knocked out of the competition in the group stage.

He made his senior debut for Panama in a 3-0 loss against Peru in August 2014. He was named in Panama's 20-man squad for the 2014 Copa Centroamericana.

In May 2018 he was named in Panama’s preliminary 35 man squad for the 2018 World Cup in Russia. However, he did not make the final 23.

References

External links

1993 births
Living people
Panamanian footballers
Alianza Panama players
Panama international footballers
2014 Copa Centroamericana players
Footballers at the 2015 Pan American Games
2021 CONCACAF Gold Cup players
Pan American Games competitors for Panama
Association football defenders